The 2006 Generali Ladies Linz is the 2006 Tier II WTA Tour tournament of the annually-held Generali Ladies Linz tennis tournament. It was the 20th edition of the tournament and was held from October 23–29, 2006 at the TipsArena Linz. Maria Sharapova won the singles title.

Points and prize money

Point distribution

Prize money

* per team

Singles main draw entrants

Seeds 

Rankings are as of 16 October 2006

Other entrants 
The following players received wildcards into the singles main draw:
  Nathalie Dechy
  Tamira Paszek

The following players received entry from the qualifying draw:
  Alona Bondarenko
  Eleni Daniilidou
  Agnieszka Radwańska
  Elena Vesnina

Withdrawals 
  Tatiana Golovin → replaced by  Michaëlla Krajicek
  Flavia Pennetta → replaced by  Mara Santangelo
  Dinara Safina → replaced by  Samantha Stosur

Retirements 
  Maria Kirilenko (right hip strain)
  Daniela Hantuchová (right rib injury)
  Mary Pierce (left knee injury)

Doubles main draw entrants

Seeds 

Rankings are as of 16 October 2006

Other entrants
The following pairs received wildcards into the doubles main draw:
  Sybille Bammer /  Melanie Klaffner
  Jelena Janković /  Tina Križan

The following pair received entry from the qualifying draw:
  Jarmila Gajdošová /  Bryanne Stewart

The following pair received entry as lucky losers:
  Martina Müller /  Julia Schruff

Withdrawals
Before the tournament
  Maria Kirilenko (right hip strain) → replaced by Müller / Schruff

During the tournament
  Nathalie Dechy (left knee pain due to a tendonitis)
  Daniela Hantuchová (right rib injury)
  Francesca Schiavone (right knee injury)
  Elena Vesnina (low back injury)

Champions

Singles

  Maria Sharapova defeated  Nadia Petrova, 7–5, 6–2.
It was the 5th singles title for Sharapova in the season and the 15th title in her career.

Doubles

  Lisa Raymond /  Samantha Stosur defeated  Corina Morariu /  Katarina Srebotnik, 6–3, 6–0
It was the 58th title for Raymond and the 15th title for Stubbs in their respective doubles careers.
It was also the 8th for the pair during the season.

References

External links
 Official Results Archive (ITF)
 Official Results Archive (WTA)

Generali Ladies Linz
Linz Open
Generali Ladies Linz
Generali Ladies Linz
Gen